Silistra Municipality is a municipality (obshtina) in Silistra Province, Northeastern Bulgaria, located along the right bank of Danube river, in the Danubian Plain, bounded by Romania to the northeast and north beyond the river. It is named after its administrative centre - the city of Silistra which is also the capital of the province.

Aside from the historical heritage of the main town, the area is best known with the Srebarna Nature Reserve around the lake of the same name. The main roads I-7, II-21 and II-71 crosses the municipality, connecting the province centre of Silistra with the cities of Shumen, Ruse and Dobrich.

Settlements 

Silistra Municipality includes the following 19 places (towns are shown in bold):

Demography 
The following table shows the change of the population during the last four decades. Since 1992 Silistra Municipality has comprised the former municipality of Profesor Ishirkovo and the numbers in the table reflect this unification.

Ethnic groups 
Ethnic Bulgarians constitute the largest ethnic group in Silistra Municipality. Turks constitute a large minority. There is also a relatively small Roma community.

See also
Provinces of Bulgaria
Municipalities of Bulgaria
List of cities and towns in Bulgaria

References

External links
 Official website 

Municipalities in Silistra Province